The discography of Silverchair, an Australian alternative rock band, consists of five studio albums, one extended play (EP), nineteen singles, one live album, two compilation albums, four video albums, and twenty music videos.

Silverchair's first single, "Tomorrow", was highly successful upon its Australian release in 1994, and provided the band an opportunity to release their music internationally. Shortly after, they released their debut album; Frogstomp. Achieving success in the United States and performing around the world, Silverchair's band members continued with their school studies, and in 1997 released Freak Show. Following the success of 1999's Neon Ballroom, Silverchair toured worldwide, then announced a break following the termination of their contract with Sony. The band joined Eleven, a record label formed by their manager John Watson.

Silverchair returned to recording in June 2001, and released Diorama in 2002. Lead singer Daniel Johns suffered from reactive arthritis while the band were touring to promote the album, and after the 2002 ARIA Awards the band announced an indefinite hiatus. Silverchair reunited after Wave Aid in 2005, and released Young Modern in 2007. Silverchair went on an indefinite hiatus in May 2011.

Albums

Studio albums

Live albums

Compilations

Box sets

Extended plays

Singles

Promotional singles

B-sides

Soundtrack appearances

Videography

Music videos

Live DVDs

Documentaries and compilations

See also

 List of Silverchair awards – full listing of all awards won by the group.

Notes

References

External links

 Silverchair discography on the band's official website

Discography
Discographies of Australian artists
Rock music group discographies